Franz Jakob is an Austrian bobsledder who competed in the mid-1970s. He won the bronze medal in the four-man event at the 1975 FIBT World Championships in Cervinia.

References
Bobsleigh four-man world championship medalists since 1930
Franz Jakob at the-sports.org

Austrian male bobsledders
Possibly living people
Year of birth missing